The short-eared possum (Trichosurus caninus) is a species of marsupial in the family Phalangeridae endemic to Australia. Found north of Sydney, the species was once classed as a mountain brushtail possum, which is its closest relative.

In the wild, they can live up to 17 years of age, have a stable territory, and invest significant energy rearing their young.

They are most commonly found along the southeastern coast of Australia, and reside in rainforests and wet dense vegetation.

References

Possums
Mammals of New South Wales
Mammals of Queensland
Mammals of Victoria (Australia)
Marsupials of Australia
Mammals described in 1836
Taxonomy articles created by Polbot